Dr. No may refer to:
 Dr. No (novel), a 1958 James Bond novel by Ian Fleming
 Dr. No (film), a 1962 film based on the novel
 Dr. No (soundtrack)
 Julius No, the title character in the Fleming novel and film adaptation
 Dr. No (serial killer), an unidentified criminal theorized to be active in Ohio between 1981 and 1990
 "Dr. No" (song), a song by Systems in Blue
 Dr. No?, a 1991 documentary by Jacob Young about William Luther Pierce

Politicians with the nickname 
 Tom Coburn, a U.S. Senator from Oklahoma and physician, known for blocking legislation
 John Kitzhaber, a Democratic Oregon governor known for vetoing bills passed by the Republican legislature
 Ian Paisley, a religious leader and First Minister of Northern Ireland, known for political obstinacy
 Ron Paul, a member of the U.S. House of Representatives from Texas and physician, who frequently cast dissenting votes
 Stuart Lyon Smith, a Canadian politician, Ontario Provincial Parliament member and psychiatrist, known for opposing spending and pessimism
 Tommy Thompson, a Wisconsin governor and state legislator known for blocking bills
 Andries Treurnicht, a South African Leader of Opposition, leader of the "no" campaign against the 1992 apartheid referendum

See also 
 Dr. Know (disambiguation)
 Dr. No's Oxperiment, an album by Oh No